The 1979 Campionato Italiano F3 season was the 15th season of the Italian Formula Three Championship.

Campionato Italiano 
Champion:  Piercarlo Ghinzani

Runner Up:  Michele Alboreto

Results

Table

Best 7 races to count

References

Formula Three
Italian Formula Three Championship seasons
1979 in Formula Three